Nicholas D. Fratt (January 25, 1825November 12, 1910) was an American businessman and politician.  He was president of the Racine County Bank for fifty years.  He also served two years in the Wisconsin State Senate and was an unsuccessful candidate for the United States House of Representatives and Governor of Wisconsin.

Biography
Nicholas Fratt was born in Watervliet, in Albany County, New York, to Catherine (Miller) and Jacob Fratt.

As a young man, he worked for his father in the provision and packing business.  At age 18, in 1843, he moved to Racine, in the Wisconsin Territory, and was employed at a packing house.  In 1844, he went into business with Charles Herrick and opened a meat market and packing business.  Two years later, his brother, Francis, arrived from New York and took the place of Herrick as his partner in the business.  The company thrived and was his primary employment for the next fourteen years.

In 1853, Fratt was one of the founders of the Racine County Bank, and would serve as President of the bank from 1859 to 1908. The bank became First National Bank & Trust Co. of Racine, and in 1988 was absorbed into Bank One Corporation.

In 1855, Fratt bought a farm west of Racine.  The land was later incorporated into the City of Racine in the neighborhood known as "West Racine".  Fratt lived on his farm until 1894, when he moved into the city and bought a home on College Avenue.

He was elected to the Wisconsin State Senate in 1858 and served in the 12th and 13th sessions of the Wisconsin Legislature (1859 and 1860).

In 1874, he was the Democratic candidate for the United States House of Representatives for Wisconsin's 1st congressional district, losing to incumbent Charles G. Williams.

Fratt ran for Governor of Wisconsin twice, in 1881 and 1884. In both elections he was defeated by Republican Jeremiah McLain Rusk.

Personal life

In 1846, Fratt married Elsie Duffes.  Duffes had been born near Aberdeen, Scotland, and immigrated with her parents, in 1835, first to Canada, then to Illinois, and, in 1840, to Racine County.  Nicholas and Elsie had eight children with six surviving to adulthood—three sons and three daughters.  Elsie died in 1890, leaving Nicholas a widower.

Nicholas Fratt died in 1910. He bequeathed land from his farm to the school district, on which the first school in West Racine was built.  The school opened in 1916 and continues to operate as Fratt Elementary School in the Racine Unified School District.

Electoral history

U.S. House of Representatives (1874)

| colspan="6" style="text-align:center;background-color: #e9e9e9;"| General Election, November 3, 1874

Wisconsin Governor (1881, 1884)

| colspan="6" style="text-align:center;background-color: #e9e9e9;"| General Election, November 8, 1881

| colspan="6" style="text-align:center;background-color: #e9e9e9;"| General Election, November 4, 1884

References

External links
 Nicholas D. Fratt at Find a Grave
 Mary J. Fratt Webster at Find a Grave
 Charles Diller Fratt at Find a Grave
 Fratt Elementary School

1825 births
1910 deaths
Democratic Party Wisconsin state senators
Politicians from Racine, Wisconsin
Businesspeople from Racine, Wisconsin
19th-century American politicians
19th-century American businesspeople